The 2010-11 is Al Zawraa's 37th season in the Iraqi Premier League. Al Zawraa will competing in the Iraqi Premier League and in the Arab Champions League.

Squad

Transfers

In

Matches

Competitive

Iraqi Premier League

Al Zawraa
Al-Zawraa SC seasons